Carquinez Strait Regional Shoreline is a regional park, part of the East Bay Regional Park District system, located in northwestern Contra Costa County, California.

Geography
The park, which is divided into two sections, that is divided in two sections by privately owned property, is located on the southern shoreline of the Carquinez Strait and eastern San Pablo Bay and in the adjacent hills, within the East Bay region of the San Francisco Bay Area.

The western park section extends from Crockett and Crockett Hills Regional Park eastwards to Port Costa. 

The larger eastern park section extends from expansive natural open spaces in the Crockett Hills, eastwards to the city of Martinez, the Martinez Regional Shoreline park, and the John Muir National Historic Site.  Trails in the Crockett Hills have unobstructed views across Carquinez Strait to Suisun Bay, Benicia, and southern Solano County.

Trails
The  - long San Francisco Bay Trail passes through the park.  Part of the Bay Area Ridge Trail also passes through the Crockett Hills area of the park.

The state built the -long Carquinez Scenic Drive along the southern shore of the strait in 1912. Decades later, it turned the  road over to Contra Costa County. Major storms and landslides in 1983 caused huge gaps in the road, forcing its permanent closure to auto traffic. Instead, the county decided to convert the abandoned road into a trail for exclusive use by hikers, joggers, cyclists and equestrians. EBRPD negotiated with Contra Costa County for nearly a decade before it reached agreement in December 2012 on an easement that allowed converting the idle roadway to a trail.  Even so, it still cost about $5.5 million to install piers, drains and walls to ensure stability of the new trail. It took several years to obtain sufficient funds for this project, The new trail, which did not open for public use until the Fall of 2014, was named for former U.S. Representative George Miller (D-Martinez), who was instrumental in obtaining $3.5 million in Federal funds for the project.

Notes

See also
 Carquinez Strait

References

External links
Official Carquinez Strait Regional Shoreline website
   Bay Area Hiker: Carquinez Strait Regional Shoreline (eastern section) — with images.
Bay Area Hiker:  Carquinez Strait Regional Shoreline (western section) — with images.

East Bay Regional Park District
Parks in Contra Costa County, California
Carquinez Strait
Martinez, California
San Francisco Bay Trail
Bay Area Ridge Trail